Willoughby Bay is a large bay on the southeastern coast of Antigua island, in Antigua and Barbuda.

References

Bays of Antigua and Barbuda
Antigua (island)